Doboj South is a municipality located in Zenica-Doboj Canton of the Federation of Bosnia and Herzegovina, an entity of Bosnia and Herzegovina. It borders with the municipality of Doboj, which is a part of Republika Srpska entity. The seat of the municipality is the village of Matuzići.

About Doboj South
The municipality Doboj South is a newly formed municipality, established as a direct consequence of war activities in this area. It is not a very large municipality, and covers an area of 10 square kilometers. It is located at the crossroads of M-4 and M-17 roads. and at the confluence of the Usora river in the Bosna river.

Demographics

Settlements
The municipality consists of the villages of Matuzići and Mravići.

Population

Ethnic composition

Sport
The local football club, NK Gradina Doboj-Jug, plays in the Regional League in Federation of Bosnia and Herzegovina.

External links
 Official site

Municipalities of Zenica-Doboj Canton